Ottoschulzia rhodoxylon is a rare species of tree in the family Icacinaceae known by the common name pincho palo de rosa. It is native to Puerto Rico and Hispaniola. When it was listed as an endangered species under the United States' Endangered Species Act in 1990 there were only nine individuals remaining on Puerto Rico.

This evergreen grows up to 4 to 5 meters tall and has thick, leathery oval leaves. The flowers have not been described in the literature. The heartwood is red in color and is suitable for woodturning.

In Puerto Rico, the tree is known from Guánica Commonwealth Forest and one location near Bayamón, and there has been a sighting of one individual in Maricao Commonwealth Forest. Deforestation has reduced the amount of suitable habitat remaining for the tree.

References

External links
USDA Plants Profile

Metteniusaceae
Flora of Puerto Rico
Flora of Haiti
Flora of the Dominican Republic